Kaarel Heinver (born Kaarel Uurmann; 22 March 1886 in Uurita, Kuusalu Parish – 1961 Loksa Selsoviet) was an Estonian politician. He was a member of VI Riigikogu (its National Council)  and the first mayor of the former Kõnnu Municipality.

References

1889 births
1961 deaths
Members of the Riiginõukogu
Mayors of places in Estonia
People from Kuusalu Parish